Non-stereospecific dipeptidase (peptidyl-D-amino acid hydrolase, D-(or L-)aminoacyl-dipeptidase) is an enzyme. This enzyme catalyses the following chemical reaction

 Hydrolysis of dipeptides containing either D- or L-amino acids or both

This is a digestive enzyme of cephalopods.

References

External links 
 

EC 3.4.13